Floored Genius 2 - Best of the BBC Sessions 1983–91 is a compilation album of BBC studio recordings by Julian Cope, released in 1993 by Nighttracks.

In 2010, an expanded edition was released with a second CD of bonus tracks by Island/Mercury.

Track listing
Adapted from the album's liner notes.

2010 expanded edition
The first disc of the expanded edition contains the seventeen tracks from the original album.

Personnel 
Credits adapted from the album's liner notes.

Musicians
Julian Cope – vocals, guitar, bass, keyboards
Donald Ross Skinner – guitar, bass, keyboards, drums
Steve "Brother Johnno" Johnson – guitar
Steve Lovell – guitar
Anthony "Moon-Eye" Foster – guitar
James Eller – bass
Tim Bran – bass 
Joss Cope – keyboards
Richard "K-R" Frost – keyboards
Gary Dwyer – drums
John Dillon – drums
Chris Whitten – drums
Mark "Rooster" Cosby – drums

Technical 
Dale Griffin – production (Disc 1 tracks 1-3, 15, 16, Disc 2 tracks 1, 9, 10)
Mark Radcliffe – production (Disc 1 tracks 4-6)
John Porter – production (Disc 1 tracks 7-10)
John Sparrow – production (Disc 1 tracks 11-13, Disc 2 track 2)
Barry Andrews – production (Disc 1 track 14, Disc 2 tracks 3, 4)
Harry Parker – production (Disc 1 track 17, Disc 2 track 8)
Ted de Bono – recording engineer (Disc 1 tracks 1-3, Disc 2 track 1)
Mike Engles – recording engineer (Disc 1 tracks 4-6)
Nick Gomm – recording engineer (Disc 1 tracks 14-16, Disc 2 tracks 3, 4, 9, 10)
Paul Long – recording engineer (Disc 1 tracks 15, 16, Disc 2 tracks 9, 10)
Martyn Parker – recording engineer (Disc 1 tracks 11-13, Disc 2 track 2)
Adhikari Allen – recording engineer (Disc 1 track 17, Disc 2 track 8)
Rob Carter – sleeve artwork
Donna Ranieri – front cover photography
Kenji Kubo – back cover photography
Mick Houghton – liner notes
Holy McGrail – reissue artwork

References

External links
 Floored Genius 2 - Best Of The BBC Sessions 1983-91 on Discogs.com. Retrieved on 11 March 2018.

Julian Cope albums
1993 compilation albums